Mavinga  is a town and municipality in Cuando Cubango Province in Angola. One of the three municipalities in Angola. Predominantly inhabited by the Mbunda and municipality had a population of 27,196 in 2014. It comprises the communes of Mavinga, Cunjamba/Dime, Cutuile and Luengue.

See also
Luengué Hunting Reserve
Mbunda language
Mbunda people

References

Further reading

Populated places in Cuando Cubango Province
Municipalities of Angola